Jonathan Oliveira Guimarães is a Brazilian footballer who currently plays as a forward for Goianésia Esporte Clube.

Career
After impressive displays with the youth ranks of CR Vasco da Gama, Jonathan was promoted to the main squad in 2010 and had excellent displays during the Brazilian League. After the hiring of Ricardo Gomes, he was sent back to the minors to gain more experience, but in June 2011 was promoted back to the senior squad.

Career statistics
(Correct )

Contract
Jonathan signed a contract with CR Vasco da Gama until the end of 2012.

Title

 Copa da Hora: 2010

References

External links
 ogol.com.br 
 Jonathan at ZeroZero

1991 births
Living people
Brazilian footballers
Campeonato Brasileiro Série A players
Campeonato Brasileiro Série B players
Campeonato Brasileiro Série C players
CR Vasco da Gama players
São Bernardo Futebol Clube players
Tombense Futebol Clube players
Treze Futebol Clube players
Associação Desportiva Cabofriense players
Guarani Esporte Clube (MG) players
Tupi Football Club players
Nova Iguaçu Futebol Clube players
Itumbiara Esporte Clube players
União Recreativa dos Trabalhadores players
Brusque Futebol Clube players
Olaria Atlético Clube players
Associação Desportiva Bahia de Feira players
Goianésia Esporte Clube players
Association football forwards
Footballers from Rio de Janeiro (city)